Jymoo Zhou is a Chinese artist based in Beijing, China. He focuses primarily on installation art projects and design at the intersection of art, environment, technology.

Biography
Jymoo was raised on Hainan island in China and graduated with a degree in Life Sciences before focusing on art.

Art work
Jymoo is known primarily for his installation projects. His most notable work is "Moon", a large white sphere illuminating LED light. It provided the audience with the opportunity to feel close to the moon and was displayed in a variety of locations around China including a lake, grassland, desert, square, roof and ruins. It received coverage from major media sources including Vice Media in China and Tencent QQ news.

References

Living people
Chinese installation artists
Year of birth missing (living people)